Baadrayal or Badhrayal is a village in Gangapur City, Sawai Madhopur district in the state of Rajasthan, India. Baadrayal is located near to the main railway line from Delhi to Mumbai, accessed via Kota on the rail path from New Delhi. 

The nearest airport is Sanganer Airport in Jaipur and the nearest railway station is Shri Mahabirji railway station and  Khandip railway station. Most of the area in the village is agricultural field. The whole village is dependent on ground water, as its only source of water. The village is known in nearby areas for a temple, Dhuni. The nearby villages are Rendayal, Gujar, Mohcha Ka Pura, and Nayagaon.

Water 
Most of the resources are Deep Tubewells which are dependent on ground water. Village is also the part of chambal SawaiMadhopur nadauti project SawaiMadhopur baler schemes.

References

Villages in Sawai Madhopur district